Warren Ukah (born March 22, 1985 in Atlanta) is an American soccer player.

Career
Ukah attended Grady High School before turning professional at the age of eighteen, in 2003 with Village United in the Jamaica National Premier League. Following the 2003–2004 Jamaican season. At nineteen, he returned to the US to play the summer season with the Wilmington Hammerheads of the USL Pro Soccer League. He went back to Village United for the 2004–2005 season then came back north in 2005 to play for the Virginia Beach Mariners in the USL Second Division.

In 2006, twenty-one-year-old Ukah signed with the Atlanta Silverbacks of the USL First Division. He spent three seasons with the Silverbacks and lead them to the league championship in 2007, but lost much of the 2008 season with injuries. The team withdrew from the league at the end of the season.  Ukah signed with the Milwaukee Wave of Major Indoor Soccer League in 2007.  He was named to the 2007–2008 MISL All-Rookie Team.

In 2009, Ukah signed with Portland Timbers', for their inaugural campaign but played just two games before moving to the Rochester Rhinos in July 2009.  On March 22, 2010 he signed with Minnesota United FC.

Ukah played for the Baltimore Blast of the Major Indoor Soccer League for the 2010–11 season.  He played in 17 of the team's 20 regular season games, scoring 19 points (1 3G, 4 2G, 8 A).

Ukah signed with NASL club FC Tampa Bay on March 28, 2011. On October 4, 2011, after conclusion of the 2011 season, FC Tampa Bay announced it would not re-sign Ukah for the 2012 season.

Ukah played in South East Asia from 2012–2013 until returning to the United States to play indoor in the MASL. Ukah, started the 2014 NISL season with Oxford City FC of Texas before being dealt to Las Vegas. In seven games with Las Vegas Legends, Ukah scored five goals before he was traded to Ontario Fury.

References

1985 births
Living people
African-American soccer players
American expatriate soccer players
American expatriate sportspeople in Jamaica
American soccer players
Atlanta Silverbacks players
Baltimore Blast (2008–2014 MISL) players
Expatriate footballers in Jamaica
Wilmington Hammerheads FC players
Virginia Beach Mariners players
Major Indoor Soccer League (2001–2008) players
Soccer players from Atlanta
USL League Two players
USL Second Division players
USL First Division players
USSF Division 2 Professional League players
Milwaukee Wave players
Portland Timbers U23s players
Rochester New York FC players
Minnesota United FC (2010–2016) players
Tampa Bay Rowdies players
Village United F.C. players
North American Soccer League players
Major Indoor Soccer League (2008–2014) players
Association football forwards
Ontario Fury players
21st-century African-American sportspeople
20th-century African-American people